Jared Timmer (born April 29, 1997) is an American soccer player who currently plays for Sacramento Republic in the USL Championship.

Career

College and amateur
Timmer played college soccer for over five seasons at Butler University between 2015 and 2019, making 67 appearances, scoring 6 goals and tallying 13 assists. Timmer captained the team for his final three seasons at Butler.

Whilst at college, Timmer played with NPSL side Grand Rapids FC in 2016. In 2017, 2018 and 2019, Timmer played in the USL League Two with Flint City Bucks, helping the team win the USL League Two title in 2019.

Professional
On March 3, 2020, Timmer joined USL Championship side Reno 1868. He made his debut on July 29, 2020, appearing as a half-time substitute during a 4–1 win over Portland Timbers 2. Reno folded their team on November 6, 2020, due to the financial impact of the COVID-19 pandemic.

On December 11, 2020, Timmer joined USL Championship club Indy Eleven ahead of their 2021 season. He was released by Indy Eleven on November 30, 2022, following the conclusion of the 2022 season. 

Timmer was announced as a new signing USL Championship side Sacramento Republic ahead of their 2023 season.

References

External links
Butler bio
Reno 1868 bio

1997 births
Living people
American soccer players
Association football midfielders
Butler Bulldogs men's soccer players
Flint City Bucks players
Indy Eleven players
National Premier Soccer League players
People from Hudsonville, Michigan
Reno 1868 FC players
Sacramento Republic FC players
Soccer players from Michigan
Sportspeople from Grand Rapids, Michigan
USL Championship players
USL League Two players